Charlie Fisher is an American former college football coach. He served as the head football coach at the University of West Georgia from 1993 to 1997 and Western Illinois University from 2016 to 2017. Fisher was the wide receivers coach at Arizona State University from 2018 to 2019.

Head coaching record

References

Year of birth missing (living people)
Living people
Arizona State Sun Devils football coaches
Eastern Kentucky Colonels football coaches
Lenoir–Rhyne Bears football coaches
Miami RedHawks football coaches
NC State Wolfpack football coaches
Ole Miss Rebels football coaches
Richmond Spiders football coaches
Temple Owls football coaches
Vanderbilt Commodores football coaches
West Georgia Wolves football coaches
Western Illinois Leathernecks football coaches
Eastern Kentucky University alumni
Springfield College (Massachusetts) alumni